Epistemological rupture (or epistemological break) is a notion introduced in 1938 by French philosopher Gaston Bachelard, and later used by Louis Althusser.

Bachelard proposed that the history of science is replete with "epistemological obstacles"—or unthought/unconscious structures that were immanent within the realm of the sciences, such as principles of division (e.g., mind/body). The history of science, Bachelard asserted, consisted in the formation and establishment of these epistemological obstacles, and then the subsequent tearing down of the obstacles. This latter stage is an epistemological rupture—where an unconscious obstacle to scientific thought is thoroughly ruptured or broken away from.

Etymology
Epistemology, from the Greek words episteme (knowledge) and logos ("word, speech") is the branch of philosophy that deals with the nature, origin and scope of knowledge. Rupture, from Old French rupture or Latin ruptura, is defined as an instance of breaking or bursting suddenly and completely, as well as a breach of a harmonious link in a figurative way.

See also

Notes and references

Change
Cognition
Concepts in epistemology
Concepts in metaphysics
Concepts in the philosophy of mind
Concepts in the philosophy of science
Epistemology of science
Knowledge
Metaphysics of mind
Metaphysics of science
Philosophical theories